Elections to Rugby Borough Council were held on 4 May 2000. One third of the council seats were up for election.  The council stayed under no overall control.  The number of councillors for each party after the election were Labour eighteen, Conservative fourteen, Liberal Democrat nine and Independent seven.

Election result

|}

References

2000 English local elections
2000
20th century in Warwickshire